Pontiac (formerly known as Pontiac—Gatineau—Labelle) is a federal electoral district in western Quebec, Canada, that has been represented in the House of Commons of Canada from 1867 to 1949 and since 1968.

In every election since its creation except 1979 and 2011, Pontiac has been a bellwether electoral district whose electoral winner also was a member of the winning party.

History
The electoral district existed over three distinct periods:
It was created by the British North America Act of 1867 which preserved existing electoral districts in Lower Canada. It was redistributed into the new electoral districts of Pontiac—Témiscamingue and Villeneuve in 1947.
In 1966, an electoral district of Pontiac was created from Pontiac—Témiscamingue and parts of Gatineau and Labelle. Then, in 1978, it was renamed "Pontiac—Gatineau—Labelle".
In 2003, the electoral district of Pontiac was created again during a redistribution of the ridings in western Quebec.

Pontiac lost territory to Argenteuil—La Petite-Nation and gained territory from Hull—Aylmer and Gatineau during the 2012 electoral redistribution.

Geography
The electoral district includes:
 the regional county municipality of Pontiac
 the Regional County Municipality of La Vallée-de-la-Gatineau, including Rapid Lake and Kitigan Zibi indian reserves
 that part of the City of Gatineau northwest of a line following Montée Paiment to Autoroute 50 to Boulevard la Vérendrye Ouest.
 that part of the City of Gatineau northwest of a line following Promenade de la Gatineau to Boulevard Saint-Raymond to Chemin Pink to Boulevard des Grives to Boulevard des Allumettières to Chemin Eardley 
 the regional county municipality of Les Collines-de-l'Outaouais (excepting L'Ange-Gardien and Notre-Dame-de-la-Salette)

The neighbouring ridings are Abitibi—Témiscamingue, Abitibi—Baie-James—Nunavik—Eeyou, Saint-Maurice—Champlain, Laurentides—Labelle, Argenteuil—La Petite-Nation, Hull—Aylmer and Gatineau (in Quebec) and Glengarry—Prescott—Russell, Ottawa—Orléans, Ottawa West—Nepean, Carleton—Mississippi Mills, and Renfrew—Nipissing—Pembroke (in Ontario).

Linguistic demographics
Anglophone: 36%
Francophone: 58%
Allophone: 6%

Members of Parliament

This riding has elected the following Members of Parliament:

Election results

Pontiac, 2003–present

Pontiac—Gatineau—Labelle, 1979–2003

Pontiac, 1968–1979

Pontiac, 1867–1948

See also
 List of Canadian federal electoral districts
 Past Canadian electoral districts

References

Campaign expense data from Elections Canada
Riding history from the Library of Parliament:
Pontiac 1867–1947
Pontiac 1966–1978
Pontiac—Gatineau—Labelle 1978–2003
Pontiac 2003–present
2011 Results from Elections Canada

Notes

Politics of Gatineau
Quebec federal electoral districts